"Field of Dreams" is a song originally written and recorded by Force & Styles featuring Jenna on vocals. The song was released on white label in 1997 and later appeared on their greatest hits album Heart of Gold (2000). In 2003 the song was covered by Flip & Fill featuring Jo James and reached No. 28 on the UK Singles Chart.

Force & Styles version
The Force & Styles version was a happy hardcore song which features the vocals of Jenna who has collaborated with the duo on several recordings. The song was produced, written and recorded by Force & Styles at their own 'UK Dance Studios', in Clacton-on-Sea, Essex in 1996. The song was pressed as a one-sided white label by UK Dance Records in 1997 and it also later appears on their greatest hits album Heart of Gold (2000).

Personnel
Force & Styles
 Paul Hobbs – producer
 Darren Mew – producer

Additional musicians
 Jenna – vocals

Flip & Fill version

Track listing
CD single
 "Field of Dreams" (radio edit) – 3:18
 "Field of Dreams" (VooDoo & Serano remix) – 6:53
 "Field of Dreams" (Q-Tex remix) – 5:50
 "Field of Dreams" (Usual Suspects remix) – 3:46

12-inch single
 "Field of Dreams" (Pascal mix) – 6:48
 "Field of Dreams" (VooDoo & Serano remix) – 6:53
 "Field of Dreams" (Q-Tex remix) – 5:50

12-inch promo
 "Field of Dreams" (Flip & Fill remix) – 6:48
 "Field of Dreams" (VooDoo & Serano remix) – 6:53
 "Field of Dreams" (Breeze & Styles remix) – 3:18
 "Field of Dreams" (Q-Tex remix) – 5:50
 "Field of Dreams" (Usual Suspects remix) – 3:46

Personnel
Flip & Fill
 Graham Turner – producer
 Mark Hall – producer

Production
 Lee Monteverde – mixing

Additional musicians
 Jo James – vocals

Other personnel
 Ignition – design

Chart performance

References

External links
 Force & Styles – 
 Flip & Fill – 
 Flip & Fill – 

1997 singles
2003 singles
Flip & Fill songs
Force & Styles songs
Songs written by Darren Styles
1996 songs